William "Bill" L. Mack (April 1, 1924 – February 17, 2009) was a provincial level politician from Alberta, Canada. He served as a member of the Legislative Assembly of Alberta from 1979 to 1982.

Political career

Mack ran for a seat to the Alberta Legislature in the 1979 Alberta general election. He won the electoral district of Edmonton-Belmont by a wide margin to hold it for the governing Progressive Conservative party

Mack retired from provincial politics at dissolution of the assembly in 1982. He died on February 17, 2009.

References

External links
Legislative Assembly of Alberta Members Listing

Progressive Conservative Association of Alberta MLAs
1924 births
2009 deaths